Biryuch is a town and the administrative center of Krasnogvardeysky District in Belgorod Oblast, Russia, located on the bank of the Tikhaya Sosna River.

It was previously known as Biryuchenskoye Komissarstvo (until January 27, 1919), Budyonny (until 1958), Krasnogvardeyskoye (until January 30, 2007).

History
It was founded on March 7, 1705 by Ivan Medkov, a Cossack sotnik, as Biryuchenskoye Komissarstvo, and was granted town status in 1779. On January 27, 1919, it was renamed Budyonny, after Semyon Budyonny. In 1958, it was renamed Krasnogvardeyskoye and demoted in status to that of a rural locality. It was granted urban-type settlement status in 1975, and in 2005 it was again granted town status. On January 30, 2007, the town's original name of Biryuch was restored.

Administrative and municipal status
Within the framework of administrative divisions, Biryuch serves as the administrative center of Krasnogvardeysky District, to which it is directly subordinated. As a municipal division, the town of Biryuch, together with two rural localities in Krasnogvardeysky District, is incorporated within Krasnogvardeysky Municipal District as Biryuch Urban Settlement.

Transportation
There is a railway station in Biryuch.

References

Notes

Sources

External links
Official website of Biryuch 
Biryuch Business Directory 

Cities and towns in Belgorod Oblast
Populated places in Krasnogvardeysky District, Belgorod Oblast
Biryuchensky Uyezd
Populated places established in 1705
1705 establishments in Russia